Octavio De La Grana (born January 28, 1961) is a Cuban-American basketball coach, currently working as an assistant coach for the Miami Heat of the National Basketball Association (NBA).

Coaching career
By 2006, De La Grana had a combined 21 years of head coaching experience at the high school level, including two stints at Florida Christian School, where he led his team to the FHSAA Class 2A State Championship in 1996, a season in which he garnered Coach of the Year honors. He also spent eight years as head basketball coach at Westminster Christian High School. In 2005, he recorded his 400th high school coaching victory. During his tenure at Florida Christian, De La Grana also spent time as the school's Athletic Director (1990–95) and faculty Department Chair for Physical Education.

Miami Heat
De La Grana began working with the Miami Heat prior to the 2006–07 season. Before the start of the 2016–17 season, Heat head coach Erik Spoelstra added De La Grana to his coaching staff as assistant coach.

Personal life
De la Grana was born in Havana, Cuba in 1961 and was only 6 years old when he came to the United States. His father was from Lajas and mother from Artemisa. De La Grana and his wife, Angie, reside in Palmetto Bay with their six children.

See also
 List of foreign NBA coaches

References

External links
 Coach information at Basketball-reference.com

1961 births
Living people
American basketball scouts
American sportspeople of Cuban descent
Basketball coaches from Florida
Cuban emigrants to the United States
Liberty University alumni
Miami Heat assistant coaches
Miami Heat scouts
People from Palmetto Bay, Florida
Sioux Falls Skyforce coaches
Sportspeople from Havana
Sportspeople from Miami-Dade County, Florida